O'Neal Airport  was a public use airport owned by Vincennes University and located in Lawrence County, Illinois, United States. The airport was one nautical mile (1.85 km) west of the central business district of Vincennes, a city in Knox County. The airport is now closed.

Facilities and aircraft 
It had three runways with turf surfaces: 9/27 is 3,450 by 150 feet (1,052 x 46 m); 14/32 is 2,625 by 135 feet (800 x 41 m); 3/21 is 2,350 by 120 feet (716 x 37 m) and was also the location of an FAA navigational aid (NAVAID), the OEA non-directional beacon (NDB).

For the 12-month period ending August 31, 2004, the airport had 8,000 general aviation aircraft operations, an average of 21 per day. At that time there were 18 aircraft based at this airport: 67% single-engine, 22% multi-engine, 6% helicopter and 6% ultralight.

References

External links 
 
 

Defunct airports in Indiana
Airports in Indiana
Transportation buildings and structures in Lawrence County, Illinois
University and college airports
Vincennes University